Thadford Leon "Red" Treadway (April 28, 1920 – May 26, 1994) was an American professional baseball player. He played two seasons in Major League Baseball in 1944-45 for the New York Giants, primarily as an outfielder. He also had an extensive career in minor league baseball, playing sixteen seasons overall from 1941-56.

Treadway is one of many ballplayers who only appeared in the major leagues during World War II. He made his major league debut on July 25, 1944 in an against the Pittsburgh Pirates at the Polo Grounds. He hit for a high average (.300) during his first season with New York, but did not hit well with men in scoring position. In 170 at bats he had only 5 runs batted in, a dismal average of one for every 34 at bats. Then, in 1945, Treadway hit only .241 in 224 at bats but had 23 RBI, an average of one for every 9.7 at bats.

Treadway's career major league totals include 138 games played, a .266 batting average (105-for-394), 4 home runs, 28 runs batted in, 54 runs scored, and an on-base percentage of .323. He was a below average defensive outfielder, making 11 errors in 211 total chances for a fielding percentage of .948.

Treadway died at the age of 74 in Atlanta.

External links 

Retrosheet

Major League Baseball outfielders
New York Giants (NL) players
Wilson Tobs players
Savannah Indians players
Atlanta Crackers players
Jersey City Giants players
Los Angeles Angels (minor league) players
Newark Bears (IL) players
Nashville Vols players
Des Moines Bruins players
Visalia Cubs players
Portsmouth Cubs players
Suffolk Goobers players
Jacksonville Beach Sea Birds players
Fitzgerald Redlegs players
Ogden Reds players
Duluth Dukes players
Fitzgerald A's players
Baseball players from North Carolina
1920 births
1994 deaths